Gaja Grzegorzewska (born 11 May 1980 in Cracow) is a Polish novelist. She is the author of crime novels about a female private detective, Julia Dobrowolska: Żniwiarz, Noc z czwartku na niedzielę, Topielica (Great Caliber Award in 2011) and Grób (2012). Finished VIII High School in Cracow and Cinematography Studies on Jagiellonian University.

Awards 

2011 Great Caliber Award for the best crime novel of the year 2010 – Topielica

External links 
Magdalena Lankosz, Gaja Grzegorzewska – kobieta bez językowej waty. "Dla mnie feminizm nie wymaga już wchodzenia na barykady" , 18 February 2013, Wysokie Obcasy
 Interview at Newsweek.pl
 Interview on Topielica book at MiastoKobiet.pl
 Short biography at Wydawnictwo EMG
 Articles by Gaja Grzegorzewska at Wprost.pl
 Biography at Booklips.pl
 Article on "Grob" (2012) at dlalejdis.pl
 Interview at kultura.wm.pl
 Interviews and articles at PolskaTimes.pl

References 

1980 births
Living people
Writers from Kraków
Polish mystery writers
Polish crime fiction writers
21st-century Polish novelists
Jagiellonian University alumni
Polish women novelists
Women mystery writers